Badminton at the 2015 ASEAN Para Games was held at OCBC Arena, Singapore.

Medal table

Medalists

Men

Women

Mixed

External links
 8th ASEAN Para Games 2015 - Singapore

2015 ASEAN Para Games
2015 in badminton
Badminton at the ASEAN Para Games
Badminton in Singapore